Willesden Logistics Hub is a freight railway station situated adjacent to the West Coast Main Line in Willesden, England.

History 
The site was rebuilt to handle container freight through the Channel Tunnel and was known as Willesden Euro Terminal, one of nine such facilities constructed. Prior to this, it was already in use as a freight handling yard. The first train departed for the tunnel on 27 June 1994. However, the site did not see as much use as hoped due to declining levels of freight trains using the Channel Tunnel. As a result, the customs facilities were de-staffed, and eventually the site stopped handling international trains. It continued to be used for domestic railfreight purposes.

The site was identified by High Speed 2 (HS2) as a candidate for use as a construction compound. Work started in 2018 to dismantle the disused cranes at the site. This was completed in March 2019.

The first train ran from the refurbished facility on 2 July 2021.

Usage 
The facility is expected to handle up to eight freight trains per day during the construction of HS2.

References 

Railway stations in Great Britain opened in 1994
Railway stations in the London Borough of Brent
Rail freight transport in Great Britain
High Speed 2